Pahoran, in the Book of Mormon, was the third chief judge of the Nephites, who inherited the position from his father Nephihah in about 67 BC, in the 24th year of the judges .

Soon after his appointment, he was opposed by the king-men, who wanted to dethrone the chief judge and replace him with a king. Supporting the chief judge and the current order were the "freemen". The people voted, and the freemen won. The king-men were unwilling to defend their country against the attacks from Amalickiah, which angered Moroni. Moroni requested Pahoran to give him the right to conscript the king-men or to have them executed for treason. Pahoran approved the request.

Several years later, Moroni writes to Pahoran to request reinforcements but with no success. Moroni complained to Pahoran and questioned his loyalty to his country. Pahoran responded that the capital, Zarahemla, was controlled by the king-men and that he had been exiled. He assures Moroni that he is not a traitor but wants only to preserve the liberty of his people. Moroni and Pahoran gathered an army against Pachus, the leader of the king-men. Pachus was slain, the king-men are executed, and Pahoran was restored to the judgement seat. Moroni and Pahoran work to drive the Lamanites from their land.

Finally, in around 53 BC, in the 39th year of the judgea, Pahoran dies, apparently while still the chief-judge.

Pahoran, son of Pahoran
Pahoran was also the name of the previous Pahoran's son. When the aforementioned Pahoran had died, he left no one to fill in his place in the judgement-seat. Three of Pahoran's sons, by the names of Pahoran, Paanchi, and Pacumeni, were left to contend for it, but the matter was settled in the 40th year of the reign of the judges, or around 52 BC, by a vote: Pahoran, the son of Pahoran, won it. Pacumeni, when he saw that he lost, accepted the outcome and supported his brother, but Paanchi, the third brother, would not. He tried to rebel but was executed according to law. His followers were so angry at that that one of them, a man named Kishkumen, went to the judgement-seat and murdered Pahoran. He then escaped the clutches of Pahoran's servants and fled.

Pahoran was succeeded by his brother, Pacumeni.

King-men
The king-men were a group of Nephites who sought to overthrow Judge Pahoran and install a king to rule the land. Some Nephites dissented from the current government and believed Chief-Judge Pahoran should change some laws, but Pahoran refused. The dissenters, called king-men, then wanted a king to be appointed to govern instead of a chief-judge. However a public vote overruled them, and the rest of the people called themselves "freemen" to distinguish their position and their desire to retain their religious freedoms. Pahoran kept his position and there was no bloodshed.

Meanwhile, Amalickiah gathered an army of Lamanites to attack the Nephites. The freemen prepared to battle, but the king-men refused to defend their country. Captain Moroni, the leader of the Nephite armies, was angry from the king-men's stubbornness and petitioned Pahoran for legal authority to compel the king-men to defend their country or be executed. By popular consent and the approval of Pahoran, Moroni and his armies quashed the king-men's rebellion, killing about 4000 men; the remainder of the king-men yielded to Moroni and took up arms in their country's defense.

See also

 Book of Mormon
 Captain Moroni

References

External links
 Book of Mormon Stories, (1997), Chapter 33: King-Men versus Freemen

Book of Mormon people